The 2022 Southeastern Louisiana Lions baseball team represented Southeastern Louisiana University during the 2022 NCAA Division I baseball season. The Lions played their home games at Pat Kenelly Diamond at Alumni Field and were led by ninth–year head coach Matt Riser. They were members of the Southland Conference.

Preseason

Southland Conference Coaches Poll
The Southland Conference Coaches Poll is to be released in the winter of 2022.

Preseason All-Southland Team & Honors

First Team
Preston Faulkner – 1st Base
Evan Keller – Shortstop
Bryce Grizzafi – Catcher
Tyler Finke – Outfielder
Brennan Stuprich – Pitcher

Second Team
Rhett Rosevear – 2nd Base
Christian Garcia – Outfielder
Will Kinzeler – Pitcher

Personnel

Schedule and results

Schedule Source:
*Rankings are based on the team's current ranking in the D1Baseball poll.
|}

Auburn Regional

References

Southeastern Louisiana Lions
Southeastern Louisiana Lions baseball seasons
Southeastern Louisiana Lions baseball
Southeastern Louisiana
Southland Conference baseball champion seasons